Acraea fornax is a butterfly in the family Nymphalidae. It is found on Madagascar.

Description

A. fornax Btlr. (55 g) may be easily known by having the basal part of the forewing as far as the apex of the cell brick-red without spots and then black (male) or black-grey (female) with three small whitish semitransparent spots in 4 to 6; the black colour is continued at the costal margin to the base and is more or less transparent, especially in the female; the marginal spots are entirely absent above but are large and red-brown beneath. Hindwing above brick-red with large, free black basal and discal dots and black, proximally somewhat dentate marginal band, in which in the male the marginal spots are absent or only distinct in 1 c to 3, but in the female 
all large and dull red-yellow; beneath the hindwing is somewhat scaled with smoky brown in the basal area as far as the discal spots and has then a whitish median band of uniform breadth and a black marginal band with triangular red-yellow marginal spots. Madagascar.

Biology
The habitat consists of forests.

Taxonomy
It is a member of the Acraea masamba  species group   -   but see also Pierre & Bernaud, 2014

References

External links

Images representing Acraea fornax at Bold

Butterflies described in 1879
fornax
Endemic fauna of Madagascar
Butterflies of Africa
Taxa named by Arthur Gardiner Butler